Haasil is a 2003 Indian crime drama film directed by Tigmanshu Dhulia. It stars Jimmy Sheirgill, Hrishitaa Bhatt, Irrfan Khan and Ashutosh Rana. Irrfan Khan won the Filmfare Award for Best Actor in a Negative Role for his portrayal of Ranvijay Singh in the movie. The film is set and shot in and around Allahabad, Uttar Pradesh.

Plot
The background of the movie is student politics in the University of Allahabad and the dirty turn it takes. When Anirudh meets Niharika at university, they quickly become romantically involved. Unfortunately, their relationship can't escape the political battles between two rival gangs of students headed by Gaurishankar Pandey and Ranvijay Singh. When Anirudh meets Ranvijay, who has eliminated Gaurishankar Pandey, the former believes that he is merely helping his fellow student.
 
Anirudh gets involved in violent politics and shoots Niharika's cousin accidentally. Ranvijay Singh helps him escape to Mumbai with the help of his aide  Anirudh later learns the truth about Ranvijay Singh whose ultimate aim is to marry Niharika.

Badrishankar Pandey, the brother of slain Gaurishankar Pandey, helps Anirudh kill Ranvijay in order to avenge the loss of his brother. A fierce gun battle takes place at the Kumbh Mela between the gangs of Ranvijay and Badrishankar Pandey before Anirudh kills Ranvijay. The Chief Minister, Kamalnath Tiwari helps them escape the crime scene and gets Anirudh discharged from all the cases as Ranvijay also blackmailed him.

Cast
 Jimmy Sheirgill as Anirudh 'Ani' Sharma
 Hrishita Bhatt as Niharika Singh
 Rajpal Yadav as Chhutku
 Irrfan Khan as Ranvijay Singh
 Varun Badola as Javed Khan
 Ashutosh Rana as Gauri Shankar Pandey
 Sudhir Pandey as CM Kamalnath Tiwari
 Tinu Anand as Mr. Karan Sharma (Aniruddha's father)
 Sharat Saxena as 	Mr. Praveen Singh (Niharika's father)
 Brijendra Kala as Shugii (Newspaper Vendor)
 Rajendranath Zutshi as Jackson
 Murad Ali as Badri Shankar Pandey
 Rajiv Gupta as SP
 Navni Parihar as Niharika's Mother
 Dadhi Pandey as Munna(Ranvijay's Gang Member)
 Deepak Kumar Bandhu as Taufik(Ranvijay's Gang Member)
 Nissar Khan as Ranvijay's Gang Member
 Pankaj Jha as Gauri Shankar's Gang Member

Soundtrack

The soundtrack features 7 songs composed by Jatin–Lalit, with lyrics from Israr Ansari, Kausar Pandey, Vindo Mahindra, Satyaprakash and Devmani Pandey. The background score of the film was composed by Abhishek Ray.

Awards

2004 Filmfare Awards
 Won – Best Actor in a Negative Role – Irrfan Khan

Critical reception

Kanchana Suggu of Rediff praised the acting performances of Ashutosh Rana, Tinnu Anand, Jimmy Shergill, Hrishita Bhatt and Irrfan Khan and said that, "Haasil is powerful, honest, real; it makes you cringe in your seat." Taran Adarsh of Bollywood Hungama gave the film a rating of 2 out of 5 saying that, "Though the film has several gripping moments and a power-packed performance by Irfan Khan, the outcome is hampered when the movie drifts into predictable zone, post-interval." Shahid Khan of Planet Bollywood praised the acting performances of all actors and gave the film a rating of 8 out of 10 saying that, "Tigmanshu Dhulia directs the film with great skill. It is admirable the way he handles the scenes of violence. They make you sit up and take notice."

Haasil was featured in Avijit Ghosh's book, 40 Retakes: Bollywood Classics You May Have Missed.

References

External links
 
 Haasil at the NY Times

2003 films
2000s Hindi-language films
Films set in Uttar Pradesh
Indian crime thriller films
Films scored by Jatin–Lalit
Films shot in Uttar Pradesh
2003 directorial debut films
Films directed by Tigmanshu Dhulia
Indian romantic thriller films
2003 crime thriller films
2000s romantic thriller films